Chen Zhihao (born July 28, 1990), better known simply as Hao, is a Chinese former professional Dota 2 player, best known for winning The International 2014 with Newbee. He is known to have been active among the Dota 2 community from 2011-2018. He was part of the Newbee eSports Club team that won the single largest money prize in video game history, a 5,028,308 payout Based on the e-Sports Earnings estimation, as of August 2, 2015, Chen "Hao" Zhihao was the highest ranking player in terms of prize money won across all competitive video games. He joined Vici Gaming in 2015. Vici finished fourth at The International 2015. On August 31, 2015, it was reported that Hao would be returning to Newbee.

Trivia
There is a nickname for Hao among the Chinese Dota players, "Hao the Hand Cutter (砍手豪)", because of the words he said when he faced RoX.KIS in 2010: "Pick Spectre for me, I will cut off my hand if we're not the winner." He is also known for spamming Spectre during the Anti-Mage craze.

Biography
Chen 'Hao' Zhihao, nicknamed General Hao by the Chinese community, is known to be one of the most aggressive players in the scene. Having joined teams such as Nirvana.cn, TyLoo, Pandarea, TongFu, Invictus Gaming, Newbee, and Vici Gaming, Hao is no stranger to LAN competitions and is also known to be extremely fervent during matches. As a carry player, he has the urge to kill which can be seen in games where he dives countless times for kills. His risky plays defines his character, and the polarizing rewards or setbacks from the outcome of his aggression can make or break the team that he plays in.

Hao has played in nearly every International, in 2011 with TyLoo (Placed 9-12th), in 2012 (Placed 7-8th) and 2013 with TongFu (Placed 4th), in 2014 with Newbee (Placed 1st), and in 2015 with Vici Gaming (Placed 4th).

Tournament placings

Defense of the Ancients

Dota 2

References

Dota players
Living people
Chinese esports players
NewBee players
Place of birth missing (living people)
1990 births